Ḥasan ibn Qatādah ibn Idrīs al-Ḥasanī was the Emir of Mecca from 1220 to 1222.

He was born to Qatadah ibn Idris and a woman from the Anaza tribe.

He assumed the Emirate after the death of his father. According to most sources, including Abu Shamah, al-Dhahabi, and Ibn Kathir, Qatadah died in Jumada I 617 AH (July 1220). Al-Mundhiri writes that he died in late Jumada II 617 AH (late August 1220), while Ibn al-Athir writes that he died in Jumada II 618 AH (July/August 1221). Historians mention that Hasan killed his father, brother, and uncle in order to gain control the Emirate.

Hasan was dethroned in Rabi al-Awwal 619 AH (April/May 1222) by al-Mas'ud Yusuf, the Ayyubid Emir of Yemen. Hassan fled to his mother's tribe, then He fled to Damascus, then to Baghdad, where he died in 623 AH (1226). A Shi'ite, Hasan was buried in the mashhad of Musa al-Kazim.

References

1226 deaths
13th-century Arabs
Banu Qatadah
Fratricides
Patricides
People from Mecca
Sharifs of Mecca
Year of birth unknown